The 1943 Stanley Cup Finals was a best-of-seven series between the Boston Bruins and the Detroit Red Wings. The Red Wings, appearing in their third straight Finals, swept the series 4–0 to win their third Stanley Cup.

Paths to the Finals
Boston defeated the Montreal Canadiens in a best-of-seven 4–1 to advance to the Finals. The Red Wings defeated the Toronto Maple Leafs in a best-of-seven 4–2 to advance and gain vengeance for Toronto's 4–3 series victory in the previous year's Finals.

Game summaries
Goalie Johnny Mowers shutout the Bruins in the final two games.

Stanley Cup engraving
The 1943 Stanley Cup was presented to Red Wings captain Sid Abel by NHL President Red Dutton following the Red Wings 2–0 win over the Bruins in game four.

The following Red Wings players and staff had their names engraved on the Stanley Cup

1942–43 Detroit Red Wings

See also
 1942–43 NHL season

References and notes

 
 Podnieks, Andrew; Hockey Hall of Fame (2004). Lord Stanley's Cup. Bolton, Ont.: Fenn Pub. pp 12, 50. 
 

Stanley Cup
Stanley Cup Finals
Boston Bruins games
Detroit Red Wings games
Stanley Cup
Ice hockey competitions in Detroit
Ice hockey competitions in Boston
Stanley Cup
Stanley Cup
Stanley Cup
1940s in Boston
Boston Garden